Melvin Sia (born 14 June 1979), is a Malaysian actor, model and singer. He won the Best Actor Award at the Malaysia Golden Awards for his role in Romantic Delicacies. He also won Most Popular Actor in Viewers' Choice category in the same award.

Career
Sia studied architecture at Universiti Teknologi Malaysia before joining the Malaysian regional edition of Star Search 2003 and went into showbiz after finishing in the top 6. In 2010 he won the Best Actor Award, his first acting award, at the inaugural Golden Awards.

He has starred in a number of telemovies and also made his Singapore cinema debut in Dance Dance Dragon opposite veterans Adrian Pang, Dennis Chew and Kym Ng. Recently, he made his debut in a mainland idol drama through Love Destiny alongside Qi Wei, iPartment stars Chen He, Lou Yixiao and many more. The 86 episodes drama was directed by Taiwanese director Chen Hui-ling who also directed high ratings Taiwanese idol dramas such as Autumn's Concerto, Material Queen.

Filmography

Dramas

2021 《酷盖爸爸》Papa & Daddy

2020 《 半是蜜糖半是伤》Love Is Sweet
2019 《你愛的台灣》Taiwan That You Love
2019《男神時代》The Way We Love
2017《親愛的王子大人》Dear Prince
2017 Die Now
 2016《獨家保鏢》V-Focus
 2016《遺憾拼圖》Life of List
 2015《致，第三者》To the Dearest Intruder
 2014《我的寶貝四千金》Dear mother
 2014《魔女搶頭婚天》Boysitter (TV series) 
 2014《16個夏天》The Way We Were 
 2012《爱情自有天意》Love Destiny
 2011《时光电台》Time FM
 2010《渔米人家》The Seeds of Life
 2010《声空感应II》Good Night DJ II
 2010《浮生劫》Tribulations of Life
 2009《碳乡》Glowing Embers
 2009《有爱。有梦。有明天》Kasih Impian Harapan
 2009《我爱麻糍》Friends Forever
 2009《美食厨师男》Romantic Delicacies
 2008《大城市小浪漫》Love in the Big City
 2008《谈谈情，舞舞狮》Lion.Hearts (Malaysian TV series)
 2008《都市恋人的追逐》Addicted to Love
 2008《情牵南苑》Age of Glory (Malaysian TV series)
 2007《爱在你左右》Love Is All Around
 2007《阳光梦田》Impian Halaman Sekinchan
 2006《原点》The Beginning (TV series)
 2005《迷情追踪》Misteri
 2005《温馨新年情》
 2005《闺家欢喜》
 2004《梦的边缘》
 2004《落翅天使》Memori Cinta Semalam
 2004《灵犀草》Rumput Jiwa
 2004《迤逦人生》
 2003《快递情缘》
 2003《听青春的声音》Irama Remaja

Movies / Films 
 2022《售命》Life for Sale
 2017《请爱我的女朋友》Please Love Her
 2014 I Am Beautiful
 2013 Ge Mei Lia
 2012《甲洞》 Kepong Gangster
 2012《龙众舞》Dance Dance Dragon
 2010《媒人帮》The Superb Match Makers
 2005《第三代》Third Generation

Theatre 
 2011《那就爱吧！》Let's Love
 2010《恋爱之第100天》JE T'AIME 100 Days

Album
 Reunion 178

CF / Print Ads 
 2010 Jonnie Walker TVC
 2010 HP Infomercial
 2007 Winter Time TVC
 2007 Total Image Collagen TVC
 2007 Canon TVC
 2006 Thompson Ginkgo TVC
 2006 Toshiba Plasma TV TVC
 2006 VISA　Eon Bank Group Print Ad and TVC
 2006 房地产 Print Ad
 2005 Natural Oil TVC
 2005 Maxis Hotlink Print Ad
 2003 Excel Isotonic Drink Print Ad and TVC

References

External links 
 Facebook
 Twitter
 

Malaysian male actors
Living people
Malaysian people of Chinese descent
People from Sarawak
1979 births